Mayriella is an Indo-Australian genus of ants in the subfamily Myrmicinae. Colonies in this genus are very small, typically consisting of 50 - 100 individuals.

Biology
Species of this genus are encountered in moist forested areas, where most specimens have been found in wet regions, while some species have been found in dry sclerophyll areas, although this is usually uncommon. Colonies only consist of 50 - 100 individuals, and nests are found in soil, typically under stones or around a small mound that contains an entrance. Ants of this genus contain stings.

Species
Mayriella abstinens Forel, 1902
Mayriella ebbei Shattuck & Barnett, 2007
Mayriella granulata Dlussky & Radchenko, 1990
Mayriella occidua Shattuck, 2007
Mayriella overbecki Viehmeyer, 1925
Mayriella sharpi Shattuck & Barnett, 2007
Mayriella spinosior Wheeler, W.M., 1935
Mayriella transfuga Baroni Urbani, 1977
Mayriella warchalowskii Borowiec, 2007

References

External links

Myrmicinae
Ant genera